Daniel Richard Bourbonnais (born March 6, 1962) is a Canadian former professional ice hockey left winger who played two seasons in the National Hockey League with the Hartford Whalers between 1981 and 1984. He was drafted 103rd overall by the Whalers in the 1981 NHL Entry Draft. He played fifty-nine career NHL games, scoring three goals and adding twenty-five assists for twenty-eight points.

Career statistics

Regular season and playoffs

References

External links
 

1962 births
Living people
Binghamton Whalers players
Calgary Wranglers (WHL) players
Canadian ice hockey left wingers
Drakkars de Caen players
Hartford Whalers draft picks
Hartford Whalers players
Heerenveen Flyers players
Pincher Creek Panthers players
Ice hockey people from Winnipeg